California's 50th district may refer to:

 California's 50th congressional district
 California's 50th State Assembly district